Unofficial South American Championships in Athletics were held in Montevideo, Uruguay in 1950.  It is stated that the event was held in celebration of the 30th anniversary of the Uruguayan Athletics Federation.  However, the foundation date of the Confederación Atlética del Uruguay (CAU) was already two years earlier on March 1, 1918.

Medal summary
Medal winners are published.

Men

Women

Medal table (unofficial)

References

External links
gbrathletics.com

U 1950
1950 in Uruguayan sport
1950 in athletics (track and field)
International athletics competitions hosted by Uruguay
1950 in South American sport